George Bussy Villiers, 4th Earl of Jersey, PC (9 June 173522 August 1805, Tunbridge Wells) was an English nobleman, peer, politician and courtier at the court of George III.

He was the oldest surviving son of William Villiers, 3rd Earl of Jersey, and his wife, the former Lady Anne Egerton, the daughter of Scroop Egerton, 1st Duke of Bridgewater, and widow of Wriothesley Russell, 3rd Duke of Bedford.

Parliament

Between 1756 and his father's death in 1769, which took him into the House of Lords, he served continuously in the House of Commons as MP for, in turn, Tamworth in Staffordshire, Aldborough in the West Riding of Yorkshire, and Dover in Kent. He followed the political lead of the Duke of Grafton in both the Commons and Lords. He was a Lord of the Admiralty from 1761 to 1763 and was sworn of the Privy Council on 11 July 1765 and served as Vice-Chamberlain from 1765 to 1769.

On his elevation to the peerage in 1769, he was made a Gentleman of the Bedchamber to George III (1769–1777) and served as Master of the Buckhounds (1782–1783) and in other court posts until 1800. Because of his courtly manners was called the "Prince of Maccaronies."

He was elected a fellow of the Society of Antiquaries in 1787.

Family

Lord Jersey married Frances Twysden at her stepfather's house in the parish of St Martin-in-the-Fields on 26 March 1770. Lady Jersey, who was seventeen years younger than her husband, became one of the more notorious mistresses of George IV in 1793, when he was still Prince of Wales. She was 40 years old at the time and more than once a grandmother.

Lord and Lady Jersey had ten children:

Lady Charlotte Anne Villiers (1771–1808), married Lord William Russell in 1789, and had issue.
Lady Anne Barbara Frances Villiers (1772–1832), married William Henry Lambton and had issue, including John Lambton, 1st Earl of Durham; married secondly Hon. Charles Wyndham, son of Charles, 2nd Earl of Egremont.
George Child Villiers, 5th Earl of Jersey (1773–1859), married Sarah Sophia Fane daughter of John Fane, 10th Earl of Westmorland, and Sarah Anne Child, only child of Robert Child, the principal shareholder in the banking firm Child & Co.
Lady Caroline Elizabeth Villiers (1774–1835), married firstly Henry Paget, 1st Marquess of Anglesey, and had issue. She divorced him in the Scottish courts in 1809 and married secondly George Campbell, 6th Duke of Argyll.
Lady Georgiana Villiers, died young.
Lady Sarah Villiers (born 1779), married Charles Nathaniel Bayley in 1799.
Hon. William Augustus Henry Villiers (1780–1813), died unmarried in America, having assumed the surname of Mansel in 1802, pursuant to the will of Louisa Barbara, Baroness Vernon.
Lady Elizabeth Villiers, died unmarried 1810.
Lady Frances Elizabeth Villiers (1786–1866), married John Ponsonby, 1st Viscount Ponsonby, in 1803.
Lady Harriet Villiers (1788–1870), married Richard Bagot, Bishop of Oxford, in 1806, and had issue.

Ancestry

References

External links

 Prints associated with George Villiers, 4th Earl of Jersey, at the British Museum

1735 births
1805 deaths
18th-century English nobility
19th-century English nobility
4
Villiers, George
British MPs 1754–1761
British MPs 1761–1768
British MPs 1768–1774
Earls in the Jacobite peerage
Masters of the Buckhounds
George Villiers, 4th Earl of Jersey
Honourable Corps of Gentlemen at Arms
Lords of the Admiralty
Viscounts Grandison